Dean Warren Headley (born 27 January 1970) is a former English professional cricketer who played international cricket for the England cricket team in the 1990s.

Headley was born in Stourbridge and comes from a famous cricketing family, being the son of Ron Headley and grandson of George Headley. He was the first Test cricketer to be both the son and grandson of Test cricketers. He was educated at Old Swinford Hospital and then Royal Grammar School Worcester where he excelled at rugby union and cricket.

He played for Worcestershire's second team in 1989, and played as a professional for Leycett Cricket Club based in Leycett just outside Newcastle-under-Lyme, Staffordshire, but his senior debut was in 1991 after he had moved to Middlesex. Clive Lloyd helped him a lot in those early years. In 1993 he moved counties again, this time to Kent. Whilst at Kent he was selected for England, playing Test and ODI cricket between 1996 and 1999. One of his greatest moments was when he won the Man of the Match award for his performance in the 4th Ashes Test in 1998 at Melbourne: Australia was making light work of chasing a target of 175, before Headley took four wickets in three overs to reduce Australia from 130/3 to 140/7; he finished with 6/60 in the innings and England won by 12 runs, their only Test victory on that tour. Due to injury he retired from cricket in 2001.

He played club cricket for Upchurch Cricket Club in Upchurch, Kent and is a cricket coach for Stamford School.

World record
On 14 September 1996, Dean Headley equalled a world record by taking three hat-tricks in a single English county season. He achieved this feat against Hampshire in Canterbury. He equalled  the world record earlier set by Charlie Parker in 1924 and J.S. Rao in 1963–64.

References

External links 
 

1970 births
Living people
Sportspeople from Stourbridge
England One Day International cricketers
England Test cricketers
Kent cricketers
Middlesex cricketers
People educated at the Royal Grammar School Worcester
English cricketers
People educated at Old Swinford Hospital
Staffordshire cricketers
English cricket coaches
Black British sportspeople